Joseph Gallen (born 2 September 1972), is a former professional footballer who is assistant coach of Perth Glory. Born in England, he made seven appearances for the Republic of Ireland U21 national team. His brothers Kevin and Steve were both professional footballers.

Playing career
Joe Gallen played for Watford, Exeter City, Shamrock Rovers, Shrewsbury Town, Dundalk and Drogheda United and represented the Republic of Ireland national under-21 football team, before his career was cut short with a back injury at the age of 26. During his time with Shrewsbury he won the 3rd division title in 1994.
He joined Shamrock Rovers with David Byrne in January 1993, also on loan from Watford, but only made three league appearances.

Coaching career
After the end of his playing career, Gallen took up coaching and after working at youth level at Queens Park Rangers, he moved onto become first the assistant manager at his old clubs Exeter and Millwall. He then joined up with Kenny Jackett to be his assistant manager at Wolves.

During his time as youth coach at QPR he brought through many talented young players into the professional ranks. As QPR at the time had no academy, many of these players were subsequently signed by other clubs. He did, however, put a lot of work into the development of Ray Jones who made it into the first team at QPR before being killed in a 2007 car accident.

Gallen acquired all of his coaching badges by the age of 28.

References

Sources
 The Hoops by Paul Doolan and Robert Goggins

1972 births
Living people
Republic of Ireland association footballers
Association football midfielders
Republic of Ireland under-21 international footballers
League of Ireland players
English Football League players
Watford F.C. players
Exeter City F.C. players
Shamrock Rovers F.C. players
Shrewsbury Town F.C. players
Dundalk F.C. players
Drogheda United F.C. players
Exeter City F.C. non-playing staff
Queens Park Rangers F.C. non-playing staff
Wolverhampton Wanderers F.C. non-playing staff
Republic of Ireland expatriate association footballers
Expatriate footballers in England